The first translation of the Bible into any of the languages of Northeast India was a Khasi version, published in 1891. Translations into many other languages have appeared since then.

By State

By date of publication

 1891 - Khasi
 1924 - Garo
 1936 - Tangkhul
 1956 - Mara
 1959 - Mizo
 1964 - Ao
 1970 - Angami
 1971 - Kuki
 1981 - Bodo
 1983 - Zou
 1984 - Meitei
 1992 - Zou
 2013 - Kokborok
 2016 - Nyishi

See also
 Bible translations into the languages of India
 List of Bible translations by language
 Bible Society of India
 List of Christian denominations in North East India

References

External links
worldbibles.org India Language List

Languages of India
Christianity in India
India